Still Waters is the second studio album by French DJ/Producer Breakbot. The album was co-produced by Breakbot and Christopher Irfane Khan-Acito; a member of the hip-hop group Outlines and a frequent collaborator of the French DJ. The album includes three singles: "Back For More", "Get Lost" and "2Good4Me".

Track listing

References

External links

2016 albums
Breakbot albums
Ed Banger Records albums